The fauna of North Macedonia has a complex zoogeographical structure. It contains faunal elements of different origins and is characterized by a high degree of relict and endemic forms. Taxonomic diversity is also present; the total number of animal species reported until now is 10,354.

The fauna of Macedonian forests is abundant and includes bears, wild boars, wolves, foxes, squirrels, chamois and deer. The lynx is found, although very rarely, in the mountains of western North Macedonia, while deer can be found in the region of Demir Kapija. Forest birds include the blackcap, the grouse, the black grouse, the imperial eagle and the forest owl.

See also 

List of snakes in North Macedonia
Flora of North Macedonia

References